Ruben II, also Roupen II or Rupen II, (c.1165–1170) was the seventh lord of Armenian Cilicia or “Lord of the Mountains” (1169–1170).

Roupen was the son of Thoros II, lord of Armenian Cilicia, by his second wife (and great niece) whose name is unknown. Thoros II abdicated in favour of his young son Roupen in 1169, and placed Roupen under the guardianship of the Regent Thomas (Thomas was the child’s maternal grandfather). However, Thoros II’s brother, Mleh disputed the succession; Mleh had fled to Nur ed-Din (the emir of Aleppo) and become a Muslim after quarreling with Thoros II and attempting to assassinate him.

Mleh refused an amicable settlement with Regent Thomas regarding the succession to the leadership of Cilicia and invaded the country with a force provided by Nur ed-Din. Fearing for Roupen’s life, Thomas entrusted the young child into the care of the patriarch Nerses IV Shnorhali in Hromkla (today Rumkale in Turkey) and fled to Antioch. This measure of caution, however, did not save the life of the young Roupen, who was followed by his uncle’s men and murdered at Hromgla.

Footnotes

Sources 
Ghazarian, Jacob G: The Armenian Kingdom in Cilicia during the Crusades: The Integration of Cilician Armenians with the Latins (1080–1393); RoutledgeCurzon (Taylor & Francis Group), 2000, Abingdon;

External links
 Smbat Sparapet's Chronicle

Ruben II of Armenia
Ruben II of Armenia
12th-century murdered monarchs
Medieval child monarchs
Monarchs who died as children
12th-century Armenian people
Monarchs of the Rubenid dynasty